is a single by American singer-songwriter Debbie Gibson. Written by Gibson and Tatsuro Yamashita, the single was released exclusively in Japan in 1990 by Warner Pioneer under the Atlantic label. It was featured in the 1990 TBS drama series . Originally released as a stand-alone single, "Without You" was included as a bonus track in the Japanese releases of Gibson's 1990 album Anything Is Possible and 1995 Greatest Hits album. It was also included in her 2017 box set We Could Be Together and the 2021 Deluxe Edition release of her 1989 album Electric Youth.

The single peaked at No. 26 on the Oricon weekly singles chart and was certified Gold by the RIAJ.

Track listing

Chart positions and certifications

Weekly charts

Certifications

Tatsuro Yamashita version 

The lyrics were based on Yamashita's memories during his high school years. The song was used by Dai-ichi Life for their corporate commercial.

The B-side, "Morning Shine", was used as the theme song of the TBS morning program .

The single peaked at No. 12 on Oricon's weekly singles chart and charted for 20 weeks, selling over 185,000 copies.

In 2021, Warner Music Japan released an animated music video of "Sayonara Natsu no Hi" to celebrate the 30th anniversary of Artisan.

Track listing

Chart positions

Weekly charts

References

External links
Debbie Gibson version
 

Tatsuro Yamashita version
  (Tatsuro Yamashita)
  (Warner Music Japan)
 
 

1990 singles
1990 songs
1991 singles
Debbie Gibson songs
Songs written by Debbie Gibson
Japanese television drama theme songs
Japanese-language songs
Atlantic Records singles
Warner Music Japan singles

ja:さよなら夏の日